HB Køge is a professional Danish football club based primarily in the town of Herfølge, and secondly in the town of Køge, both in the Køge Municipality, part of 'Region of Zealand', in the eastern part of Zealand, south of Copenhagen. It was created through the merger of Herfølge Boldklub and Køge Boldklub in 2009.

History
The Danish 1st Division club Herfølge Boldklub and bankrupt club Køge Boldklub decided in March 2009 to merge. The club played their first season as a merged club in the 2009–10 season of the Danish Superliga. The season ended in relegation.

In the following 1st Division season, they finished second and returned to the Superliga. Following the promotion manager Aurelijus Skarbalius left the club for a job as assistant manager of Brøndby IF and was replaced by Tommy Møller Nielsen. The club's second appearance in the Danish Superliga ended in another relegation.

The 2012–13 season started with a series of bad results, and this led to the sacking of Møller Nielsen in September 2012 after a 5–0 defeat against Lyngby Boldklub. He was replaced by his assistant Per Frandsen, who led the club to two consecutive sixth-place finishes before leaving for a youth job at Brøndby IF in June 2014.

Players

Current squad

Youth players in use 2022/23

Out on loan

Club officials

Managers
 Aurelijus Skarbalius (2009–2011)
 Tommy Møller Nielsen (2011–2012)
 Per Frandsen (2012–2014)
 Henrik Pedersen (2014–2015)
 Henrik Lehm (2016–2018)
 Morten Karlsen (2018–2019)
 Aurelijus Skarbalius (2020–2021)
 Daniel Agger (2021–present)

Partnership

 FK Utenis Utena

References

External links

 Official website

 
Herfølge Boldklub
Association football clubs established in 2009
Football clubs in Denmark
HB Koge
2009 establishments in Denmark